Scaphocera is a genus of moths in the subfamily Lymantriinae from Madagascar. The genus was erected by Max Saalmüller in 1884.

Species
Species of this genus are:
Scaphocera marginepunctata (Saalmüller, 1878)
Scaphocera turlini Griveaud, 1973

References

Lymantriinae
Moth genera
Taxa named by Max Saalmüller